Mississippi Highway 536 (MS 536) is an unsigned highway that runs from MS 15 southwest of Laurel to MS 63 southwest of Waynesboro in the U.S. state of Mississippi. The majority of the route is a dirt road that runs through De Soto National Forest.

Route description
The two-lane state-maintained roadway heads north as George Boutwell Road. It heads past some houses and open fields and makes a sharp curve to the east before resuming a northeasterly course. At Road 201, the MS 536 designation turns onto it which is a dirt road. Heading southeast, the road's surroundings becomes completely forest as it formally enters De Soto National Forest. Upon entering Wayne County, the road name becomes Strickland Road, but remains a dirt surface. Through the Wayne County portion, MS 536 remains on an easterly course through the forest, though some open fields and homes appear along the road. At the end of Strickland Road, the MS 536 turns to the north onto the paved but not state maintained Camp 8 Road.

History
MS 536 first appeared on state maps in 1960. It may have been state maintained at the time of its designation around 1959 however by 1962, it was not. By 1967, the state removed MS 536 from its map and had not reappeared until its 1998 map. No major changes to its routing have occurred since its initial designation

Major intersections

References

External links

536
Transportation in Jones County, Mississippi
Transportation in Wayne County, Mississippi